This article records new taxa of fossil plants that are scheduled to be described during the year 2015, as well as other significant discoveries and events related to paleobotany that are scheduled to occur in the year 2015.

Ferns and fern allies

Marchantiophyta

Bennettitales

Czekanowskiales

Ginkgophytes

Conifers

Araucariaceae

Cupressaceae

Pinaceae

Other conifers

Conifer research
 A study on the morphology, identity and affinity of the purported Cretaceous pitcher plant Archaeamphora longicervia is published by Wong et al. (2015), who interpret the supposed pitchers as insect-induced leaf galls, and consider A. longicervia to be insect-galled leaves of the gymnosperm species Liaoningocladus boii.

Other seed plants

Flowering plants

Basal angiosperms

Unplaced non-eudicots

Magnoliids

Monocots

Basal eudicots

Superasterids

Angiosperm research
 Pollen grains representing the oldest fossils of members of the family Asteraceae discovered so far are described from the Late Cretaceous of Antarctica by Barreda et al. (2015).

Superrosids

Saxifragales

Vitales

Fabids

Malvids

Other angiosperms

Other plants

References

Paleobotany
Paleontology
2015 in paleontology